Boyd's shearwater (Puffinus boydi), also known as the Cape Verde little shearwater, is a small shearwater which breeds in the Cape Verde archipelago of the Atlantic Ocean some 570 km off the coast of West Africa.  The epithet commemorates British ornithologist Arnold Boyd.

Taxonomy
Boyd's shearwater is sometimes considered a subspecies of either the little shearwater, Audubon's shearwater or Macaronesian shearwater.  It has also been shown to be synonymous with the extinct Puffinus parvus Shufeldt of Bermuda.

References

Puffinus
Birds described in 1912
Endemic birds of Cape Verde